This is a list of Number 1 hit singles in 1975 in New Zealand, starting with the first chart dated, 17 January 1975.

Chart 

Key
 – Single of New Zealand origin

Notes

 Number of number-one singles: 8
 Longest run at number-one: "Wasted Days and Wasted Nights" by Freddy Fender (12 weeks).

See also

 1975 in music
 RIANZ

References

External links
 The Official NZ Music Chart, RIANZ website

1975 in New Zealand
1975 record charts
1975
1970s in New Zealand music